Heideck is a town with full legal town charter in the district of Roth, in Bavaria, Germany. It is situated in the Metropolitan Area of Nuremberg and at the same time in the Franconian Lake District.

History
Heideck was first mentioned in 1288.

Mayors
 1945-1948: Georg Stücklen ( CSU) 
 1948-1972: Johann "Hans" Stücklen (CSU)
 1972-1990: Benno Eckert (CSU)
 1990-2002: Hans Herger (Free voters Bavaria)
 2002-2014: Ottmar Brunner (CSU)
 From 2014 onwards: Ralf Beyer (Free voters Heideck)

Notable people

 Richard Stücklen (20 August 1916 - 2 May 2002): German politician (CSU), President of the Bundestag, Federal Minister for Post and Communication

References

External links
 Official site 

Roth (district)